Velle (also called Velde or Vellamelen) is a village in the municipality of Steinkjer in Trøndelag county, Norway. The village sits at the end of one of the innermost parts of the Trondheimsfjord, west of the village of Følling and northeast of the villages of Beitstad and Bartnes.

References

Villages in Trøndelag
Steinkjer